Ekaterina Igorevna Valkova (born 17 May 1991) is a Russian judoka who competes in the 63 kg division. In 2016, she won a bronze medal at the European championships, but was eliminated in the first round at the Rio Olympics.

References

External links

 
 

1991 births
Living people
People from Labinsk
Russian female judoka
Olympic judoka of Russia
Judoka at the 2016 Summer Olympics
Sportspeople from Krasnodar Krai
21st-century Russian women